James B. Smith was a Scottish footballer who played for clubs including Dunfermline Athletic, Heart of Midlothian and Dundee United as an outside right, though he began his career as a centre forward and in the last years of his career was used at inside left.

He made three appearances for the Scottish League XI (all in the annual fixture against the Irish League representative team), and played in a trial for the full Scotland team in 1924.

References

Date of birth missing
Date of death missing
Place of death missing
Footballers from Glasgow
Association football outside forwards
Scottish footballers
St Anthony's F.C. players
Dunfermline Athletic F.C. players
Bo'ness F.C. players
Raith Rovers F.C. players
Heart of Midlothian F.C. players
East Stirlingshire F.C. players
Dundee United F.C. players
Clydebank F.C. (1914) players
Cork City F.C. players
Scottish Football League players
Scottish Junior Football Association players
League of Ireland players
Scottish expatriate sportspeople in Ireland
Expatriate association footballers in the Republic of Ireland
Scottish expatriate footballers
Scottish Football League representative players